Anolis scriptus, the southern Bahamas anole or Silver Key anole, is a species of lizard in the family Dactyloidae. The species is found in the Bahamas and Turks and Caicos Islands

References

Anoles
Reptiles described in 1887
Reptiles of the Bahamas
Taxa named by Samuel Garman